The tonal system is a base 16 system of notation (predating the widespread use of hexadecimal in computing), arithmetic, and metrology proposed in 1859 by John W. Nystrom.  In addition to new weights and measures, his proposal included a new calendar with sixteen months, a new system of coinage, and a clock with sixteen major divisions of the day (called tims). Nystrom advocated his system thus:

Names for the numbers
He proposed names for the digits, calling zero "noll" and counting (from one to sixteen):

"An,  de,  ti,  go,  su,  by,  ra,  me,  ni,  ko,  hu,  vy,  la,  po,  fy,  ton." (Therefore, tonal system.)

Because hexadecimal requires sixteen digits, Nystrom supplemented the existing decimal digits 0 through 9 with his own invented characters (shown on his clockface above) and changed the value of 9 to ten. Later, the hexadecimal notation overcame this same obstacle by using the digits 0 through 9 followed by the letters A through F.

The numbers 1116 and 1216 would be said "tonan", "tonde", etc.  The table below shows Nystrom's names for successive powers of 1016.

Thus, the hexadecimal number 1510,0000 would be "mill-susanton-bong".  This first hexadecimal system, proposed in the 19th century, has thus far not achieved widespread usage.

Although Nystrom did not propose a language for tonal fractions, his nomenclature for units of measure does provide one: the name of a power of sixteen before the base unit's name multiplies it by that number, but a power of sixteen after the base unit's name divides it by that number. Thus, de timtons means  tim.

Geography

For latitudes he put 0 at the North Pole, 4 at the equator and 8 at the South Pole. The units were called tims. They are the same as the colatitudes measured in turns times 16.

Music

In his book he made a reference to music notation, where binary division is already in use for time. He also discussed the problem of pitch inflation, which he proposed to solve by setting the A below middle C to a frequency of san per timmill (194 Hz).

References

Hexadecimal numeral system